Carlo Giuseppe Stelluti (2 June 1944 – 1 March 2023) was an Italian trade unionist and politician. A member of the Democrats of the Left, he served in the Chamber of Deputies from 1996 to 2001.

Stelluti died in Busto Arsizio on 1 March 2023, at the age of 78.

References

1944 births
2023 deaths
Italian trade unionists
Democrats of the Left politicians
Deputies of Legislature XIII of Italy
Mayors of places in Lombardy
University of Trento alumni
People from Busto Arsizio